American recording artist LeAnn Rimes has released 17 studio albums, ten compilation albums, one live album, one soundtrack album, three extended plays (EP's), 56 singles, nine Christmas singles and 19 promotional singles. Rimes has sold over 37 million records worldwide to date, with 16.5 million albums and 5.5 million singles certified by RIAA. Rimes was ranked the number 17 Best Selling Artist of the 1990-99 decade by Billboard. She was also ranked at number 184 on Billboard 200 Artists and number 31 on Country Artists of the 2000–09 decade. 

She began recording at age 11 and released three studio albums on the independent Nor Va Jak label. In 1995, she was signed to Curb Records in Nashville, Tennessee. In 1996, her debut single titled "Blue" was released and peaked at number ten on the Billboard Hot Country Songs chart. The song also topped the Canadian RPM Country Tracks list and reached charting positions in other countries. Her debut album of the same name was also issued on Curb in 1996 and sold over ten million copies worldwide. Other singles spawned from the album were "The Light in Your Eyes" and the number one country song "One Way Ticket (Because I Can)". Curb followed the disc with the compilation Unchained Melody: The Early Years, which was her first to reach number one on the United States all-albums chart. 

In 1997, Rimes crossed over into pop music with the single "How Do I Live". It reached number two on the Billboard Hot 100 and crossed over internationally to several countries. The radio remix was later included on her next studio release You Light Up My Life: Inspirational Songs. The disc reached number one on the Billboard 200 and the Canadian RPM albums chart. In 1998, Rimes released Sittin' on Top of the World, which featured the top ten country singles "Commitment" and "Nothin' New Under the Moon". In 1999, she released a self-titled album of cover songs, which certified platinum in sales. One new recording was also featured titled "Big Deal", which reached the top ten of the North American country surveys. In 2001, Curb Records released the compilation I Need You, which featured the crossover hits "Can't Fight the Moonlight" and the title track.

In 2002, Rimes released her next studio record called Twisted Angel, which certified gold in the United States and included three singles. She followed it with her first Greatest Hits (2004) project. Rimes also released her first Christmas studio record in 2004 titled What a Wonderful World. In 2005, she issued the country project This Woman, which debuted at number two on the country albums chart and spawned three top ten country songs. It was followed by the international studio release Whatever We Wanna (2006) and the country disc Family. The album also reached the top five on the United States album charts. Rimes released two more studio albums on Curb before moving to RCA Records in 2016 to release the album Remnants. The project reached number 15 in the United Kingdom and the number 88 in the United States.

Albums

Studio albums

Compilation albums

Live albums

Soundtrack albums

Extended plays

Singles

As lead artist

As a featured artist

Christmas singles

Promotional singles

Other album appearances

Notes

References

External links
 LeAnn Rimes discography at her official website

Country music discographies
Discographies of American artists
Discography